Valdir Joaquim de Moraes (November 23, 1931 – January 11, 2020) was a Brazilian football player at the position of goalkeeper. He spent all his playing career with Palmeiras from 1958 to 1969.

On 11 January 2020, de Moraes died at age 88 from multiple organ failure.

Honours
Campeonato Brasileiro Série A: 1960, 1967, 1967 
Rio-São Paulo Tournament: 1965
São Paulo State Championship: 1959, 1963, 1966

References

1931 births
2020 deaths
Deaths from multiple organ failure
Brazilian footballers
Association football goalkeepers
Sociedade Esportiva Palmeiras players
Brazilian football managers
Sociedade Esportiva Palmeiras managers
Grêmio Foot-Ball Porto Alegrense managers
São Paulo FC managers
Sport Club Corinthians Paulista managers
Footballers from Porto Alegre